Amruta Sinchana Spiritual University is a proposed Private University in Bangalore, Karnataka State of India..

Present Status
The MoU for this university project was signed during Karnataka Global Investor's Meet (GIM), 2012 in June 2012 with a proposed investment promise of approximate INR 1000 Crores (Approx: USD 190 Million).

Promoters

The university is promoted by a Bangalore-based, Harsha Kriya Foundation (R) Trust.

See also

Harshakriya Foundation (R) Trust (www.harshakriya.org)

References

External links 

Universities in Bangalore